Ludovic Garreau (born 21 February 1983) is a French former professional ice hockey player. He is currently head coach of the Scorpions de Mulhouse under-22 team.

Career 

Garreau began his senior career with FFHG Division 1 team Aigles de Nice in 2002. He moved to Rapaces de Gap of the Ligue Magnus for 2003 and 2004 before departing for Sweden's Division 2 in 2005. He played one season with Vimmerby IK and another with Grästorps IK before returning to France and the Lyon Hockey Club for 2007.

While he never played for a championship winning team, Garreau twice played with teams finishing in second place: the junior Anglet Hormadi team in 2001 and the Lyon Hockey Club FFHG Division 2 team of 2007.

In 2009, he joined Castors d'Avignon of Division 1,as captain and coach(started from the 6th match againsted with Deuil-Garges) at season 2010, he helped Avignon club echeloned successfully finally. 
He retired in 2011 and became Youth Hockey Supervisor of Scorpions de Mulhouse and later became head coach of their under-22 team.

External links

French ice hockey defencemen
1983 births
Living people
Sportspeople from Annecy
Rapaces de Gap players